Pou whakarae is the main post in the palisade of a Māori pā. They are traditionally made of wood and are carved.

See also
Pou whenua

References 

Māori art
Māori culture